IDD or Idd may refer to:

Academia 

International Development Department, an academic department on poverty reduction at the University of Birmingham
 Integrated Dual Degree program

Locations 
 Idd, a parish and former municipality in Halden, Norway

People with the surname 

 Dolal Idd, an American killed in an exchange of gunfire with Minneapolis police

Science and technology 
 Insulin-dependent diabetes, called diabetes mellitus type 1 
 Interictal dysphoric disorder
 International direct dialing, in telephony
 Iodine deficiency disorders, commonly used when discussing IDD eradication programs
 IDD, the electric current in the drains of a CMOS circuit
 Interface Design Description, in the military software standard MIL-STD-498
 Intellectual Development Disorder
 Integration Driven Development